The 1935–36 Michigan Wolverines men's basketball team represented the University of Michigan in intercollegiate basketball during the 1935–36 season.  The team compiled a 15–5 record, and 7–5 against Big Ten Conference opponents.  The team scored 700 points in 20 games for an average of 35.0 points per game – the highest point total and scoring per game in school history up to that time.  Michigan finished tied for third place in the Big Ten.

Scoring statistics

Coaching staff
Franklin Cappon - coach
Fielding H. Yost - athletic director

References

Michigan
Michigan Wolverines men's basketball seasons
Michigan Wolverines basketball
Michigan Wolverines basketball